Llancahue River (Spanish: Río Llancahue) is a river in Panguipulli commune, southern Chile. It drains Pellaifa Lake and flows westward into Calafquén Lake of which it is the primary source.

See also
List of rivers of Chile

Rivers of Chile
Rivers of Los Ríos Region